A fuel cell forklift (also called a fuel cell lift truck) is a fuel cell powered industrial forklift used to lift and transport materials.

History
 1960Allis-Chalmers builds the first fuel cell forklift.

Market
In 2013 there were over 4,000 fuel cell forklifts used in material handling in the United States. Fuel cell fleets are currently being operated by a number of companies, including Sysco Foods, FedEx Freight, GENCO (at Wegmans, Coca-Cola, Kimberly Clark, and Whole Foods). Europe previously used 30 fuel cell forklifts, later expanding to use 200 units.  With other projects in France and Austria.

Uses
PEM fuel-cell-powered forklifts provide benefits over petroleum-powered forklifts as they produce no local emissions.  While LP Gas (propane) forklifts are more popular and often used indoors, they cannot accommodate certain food sector applications.  Fuel cell power efficiency (40–50%) is about half that of lithium-ion batteries (80–90%), but they have a higher energy density which may allow forklifts to run longer. Fuel-cell-powered forklifts are often used in refrigerated warehouses as their performance is not as affected by temperature as some types of lithium batteries. Most fuel cells used for material handling purposes are powered by PEM fuel cells, although some DMFC forklifts are coming onto the market. In design the FC units are often made as drop-in replacements.

Research
2013Toyota Industries (Toyota Shokki) showcased a new fuel cell powered forklift, co-developed with Toyoda Gosei Co., Ltd.
2015HySA Systems (UWC) showcased a fuel cell powered forklift using a refueling station based on metal hydrides. The customer was Implats, a mining company in South Africa. This was the first project of this type on the African continent.

Standards
SAE J 2601/3 - SAE J 2601/3 - Fueling Protocols for Gaseous Hydrogen Powered Industrial Forklifts

References

Engineering vehicles
Electric vehicles
Trucks
Material-handling equipment
Fuel cell vehicles